

185001–185100 

|-id=020
| 185020 Pratte ||  || John R. Pratte (born 1941) is an associate who has been instrumental in the construction of instrumentation at the U.S. Astronomical Research Observatory  in Charleston, Illinois || 
|-id=039
| 185039 Alessiapossenti ||  || Alessia Possenti (born 1972), daughter-in-law of Italian amateur astronomer Vincenzo Casulli who discovered this minor planet || 
|}

185101–185200 

|-
| 185101 Balearicuni ||  || The University of the Balearic Islands (UIB;) is a Balearic Spanish university, founded in 1978 and located in Palma on the island of Majorca. || 
|-id=150
| 185150 Panevezys ||  || Panevezys, capital of the Aukstaitija region in North Lithuania || 
|-id=164
| 185164 Ingeburgherz ||  || Ingeburg Herz (born 1920), co-owner of Tchibo and one of the most successful German entrepreneurs || 
|}

185201–185300 

|-id=216
| 185216 Gueiren ||  || Gueiren (meaning all to be benevolent), is the earliest developed area in Taiwan || 
|-id=250
| 185250 Korostyshiv ||  || Korostyshiv, an ancient city in Ukraine located on the Teteriv river || 
|}

185301–185400 

|-id=321
| 185321 Kammerlander ||  || Hans Kammerlander (born 1956), an Italian mountaineer and explorer, who has climbed twelve of the world's fourteen 8000-m mountains. || 
|-id=325
| 185325 Anupabhagwat ||  || Anupama Bhagwat (born 1974), an Indian sitar player and composer of Hindustani classical music || 
|-id=364
| 185364 Sunweihsin ||  || Wei-Hsin Sun (born 1957), director of National Museum of Natural Science in Taiwan || 
|}

185401–185500 

|-id=448
| 185448 Nomentum ||  || Mentana, an Italian town near Rome. The town's ancient name was "Nomentum", to which the Via Nomentana led from Rome. || 
|-id=498
| 185498 Majorcastroinst || 2007 SN || The Institute of Astronomy and Astronautics of Mallorca (IAAM) a non-profit multidisciplinary scientific entity, made up of entrepreneurs from different areas of science and knowledge, founded to promote science and technology in Balearic society (Src). || 
|}

185501–185600 

|-id=535
| 185535 Gangda ||  || GangDa, the Chinese abbreviation for the University of Hong Kong (Xiang Gang Da Xue), is the first and foremost tertiary institution in Hong Kong || 
|-id=538
| 185538 Fangcheng ||  || Fang Cheng (born 1938), Chinese astrophysicist || 
|-id=546
| 185546 Yushan ||  || Yu Shan (3,952 m), the highest mountain of Taiwan, located in the Jade Mountain Range || 
|-id=554
| 185554 Bikushev ||  || Artyom Bikushev (1986–2008), a student at Kazan State University || 
|-id=560
| 185560 Harrykroto ||  || Harry Kroto (born 1939), an English chemist and Fellow of the Royal Society || 
|-id=561
| 185561 Miquelsiquier ||  || Miquel Siquier Capó (born 1955), professor of mathematics and former president of the Institute of Astronomy and Astronautics of Mallorca (Src). || 
|-id=576
| 185576 Covichi ||  || Covadonga Lacruz Camblor (born 1990), daughter of Spanish astronomer Juan Lacruz who discovered this minor planet. "Covichi" is her nickname. || 
|-id=577
| 185577 Hhaihao ||  || The Chinese city of Haikou (Hhaihao City), capital and most populous city of the province of Hainan || 
|-id=579
| 185579 Jorgejuan ||  || Jorge Juan y Santacilia (1713–1773) was a Spanish sailor who founded the Royal Observatory of Madrid in 1757. He measured the length of the terrestrial meridian and determined that Earth is an oblate spheroid. || 
|-id=580
| 185580 Andratx ||  || The Spanish village of Andratx, located in the west of the island of Mallorca || 
|}

185601–185700 

|-id=633
| 185633 Rainbach || 2008 DO || The municipality of Rainbach, Austria, where the discovering Gaisberg Observatory is located || 
|-id=636
| 185636 Shiao Lin ||  || Literally "Little Forest" in Mandarin Chinese, a village in Kaohsiung, Taiwan which was buried in a landslide caused by Typhoon Morakot on August 8, 2009 || 
|-id=638
| 185638 Erwinschwab ||  || Erwin Schwab (born 1964), German amateur astronomer and discoverer of minor planets || 
|-id=639
| 185639 Rainerkling ||  || Rainer Kling (born 1952), German amateur astronomer and discoverer of minor planets || 
|-id=640
| 185640 Sunyisui ||  || Sun Yisui is an astronomer who has made contributions to both celestial mechanics and nonlinear dynamics. Elected an academician of the Chinese Academy of Sciences in 1997 || 
|-id=641
| 185641 Judd ||  || Michele Judd (born 1965) was a senior engineer in the Jet Propulsion Laboratory Science Division 32 from 2003 to 2008 || 
|}

185701–185800 

|-id=733
|  185733 Luigicolzani ||  || Luigi Colzani (1922–2015), an enthusiastic and helpful collaborator at Sormano Astronomical Observatory  in Italy || 
|-id=744
|  185744 Hogan ||  || Craig Hogan (born 1955), an American astrophysicist with the Sloan Digital Sky Survey || 
|}

185801–185900 

|-bgcolor=#f2f2f2
| colspan=4 align=center | 
|}

185901–186000 

|-bgcolor=#f2f2f2
| colspan=4 align=center | 
|}

References 

185001-186000